Hellinsia barbatus is a moth of the family Pterophoridae that is found in Colombia and Costa Rica.

References

barbatus
Moths described in 1996
Moths of Central America
Moths of South America